David Benjamin Wain (born August 1, 1969) is an American comedian, writer, actor, and director. He has co-written and directed six feature films, including Wet Hot American Summer (2001), Role Models (2008), Wanderlust (2012) and They Came Together (2014). He has also served as a creator, producer, writer and director on a number of television series, including Wet Hot American Summer: Ten Years Later, Wet Hot American Summer: First Day of Camp, Childrens Hospital and Medical Police. He has had small roles in most of the films and TV series he has produced or directed. He also had a starring voice role, as the Warden, on the 2008-2014 animated Adult Swim series Superjail!

He began his career as a member of the sketch comedy troupe The State. The group had their own TV show on MTV from 1993 to 1995, The State, for which Wain directed many of the sketches.  He is also a member of the comedy trio Stella, along with two other members of The State. The three wrote and starred in short films called the Stella shorts, as well as the 2005 TV series Stella.

Early life
Wain was born to a Jewish family in Shaker Heights, Ohio, the son of Nina (née Saul) and Norman Wain. As a young man, Wain went to a summer camp in Canaan, Maine, on which Wet Hot American Summer was loosely based.

Career
In 1988 while attending NYU film school, Wain became a founding member of the sketch comedy group The New Group. This group later came to be known as The State, and in 1993 he and his fellow members created and starred in The State, a sketch show that lasted 26 episodes on MTV. Wain and Michael Patrick Jann directed most of the show's sketches.

In 1997, Wain, Michael Ian Black, and Michael Showalter formed the comedy trio Stella.

Wain's first feature film, Wet Hot American Summer (2001), was an absurdist summer camp comedy starring Janeane Garofalo, David Hyde Pierce, Molly Shannon, Paul Rudd, Christopher Meloni, Bradley Cooper, Amy Poehler, Ken Marino and Elizabeth Banks. Wain directed the film, and co-wrote and co-produced it with Showalter, who also plays a lead role.

His second feature film The Ten, starring Winona Ryder and Paul Rudd (and a large ensemble cast of well-known actors), had a short theatrical run and was released on DVD on January 15, 2008.

Wain's third feature, Role Models, starring Paul Rudd, Seann William Scott, Christopher Mintz-Plasse, Jane Lynch and Elizabeth Banks, was his first widely released film. Released in theaters on November 7, 2008, the film received positive reviews from critics and fans alike, as well as earning $19 million on its opening weekend.

Wain starred in a web series titled Wainy Days on the website My Damn Channel, which ran for five seasons and ended in January 2012. The series follows a fictionalized version of Wain through his everyday life as he tries to romance numerous women and discusses his problems with his friends at the sweatshop where he works. Elizabeth Banks, Jonah Hill, Jason Sudeikis, Rob Corddry, Thomas Lennon, Josh Charles, Paul Rudd, and Michael Ian Black, and various other Stella, The State and Wet Hot American Summer alumni have all guest-starred in various episodes. The recurring cast included A.D. Miles, Matt Ballard and Zandy Hartig, who was instrumental in the creation of the series. 

As one third of the comedy troupe Stella, Wain has co-hosted the long running nightclub show in New York City, toured the United States and made a series of shorts with the group, and eventually help create a 2005 series on Comedy Central based on their routines.

Wain is featured as the voice of The Warden in the animated series Superjail!. He was a featured commentator in the I Love the 70s series, I Love the 90s Part Deux series, and the weekly VH1 show Best Week Ever.. With The State, Wain co-wrote the book State by State with The State. He has appeared in such movies as The Baxter, Keeping the Faith and Role Models. Wain's fourth feature film, Wanderlust, was released on February 24, 2012. It stars Jennifer Aniston, Paul Rudd, Malin Akerman and Alan Alda. Wain directed the film, from a screenplay he wrote with Ken Marino, and has a cameo in the film as a TV weatherman.

His fifth feature, the romantic parody They Came Together, was released in June 2014. The cast includes Paul Rudd, Amy Poehler, Ed Helms, Cobie Smulders, Max Greenfield, and Christopher Meloni.  Wain and Showalter co-wrote the eight-episode Netflix prequel Wet Hot American Summer: First Day of Camp based on the 2001 film with almost the entire cast of the original film returning. The series premiered on July 31, 2015, and was more well received by critics. He returned to co-write and direct another Netflix sequel Wet Hot American Summer: Ten Years Later, which premiered in 2017.

In 2018 Wain directed A Futile and Stupid Gesture, a feature film biography of National Lampoon founder Doug Kenney, starring Will Forte,  Domhnall Gleeson and Joel McHale.

Personal life
Wain lives in Los Angeles. He has two sons and is divorced from Zandy Hartig, an actress and producer.

Filmography

Film

Acting roles

Television

Acting roles

References

External links

Wainy Days series

1969 births
Living people
American sketch comedians
American male comedians
21st-century American comedians
American male film actors
American film producers
American male screenwriters
American male television actors
American male voice actors
American male web series actors
21st-century American male actors
Comedy film directors
Jewish American male actors
Jewish American writers
Jewish American comedians
American parodists
Parody film directors
American television directors
American television writers
Tisch School of the Arts alumni
Male actors from Cleveland
Actors from Shaker Heights, Ohio
Writers from Shaker Heights, Ohio
Film directors from Ohio
American male television writers
Screenwriters from Ohio
Jewish American male comedians